The following is a list of schools in Pakistan, categorized by province/territory and by district.

Azad Jammu & Kashmir

Mirpur
 Balseri Government Girls' Middle School
 Bahriatown School System
 Batengi Primary School
 Behdi Girls' Primary School
 Unique High School
 Joined Forces School
 Fauji Foundation Model School
 Roots School System
 Dar-e-Arqam Schools
 The Sepal Schools International, Mirpur campus
 The City School

Bhimber
 Army Public School and College
 Dar-e-Arqam Schools
 READ Foundation College

Rawalakot
 Dar-e-Arqam Schools
 The Educators

Gilgit–Baltistan

Gilgit
 Public Schools and Colleges Jutial, Gilgit

Skardu 
 Army Public School and College
 Cadet College

Khyber Pakhtunkhwa

Abbottabad

 Abbottabad Public School (APS)
 Army Burn Hall College (ABHC)
 Pakistan International Public School and College (PIPS)

Battagram
 Al Syed Garden Public School & College, Battagram
 Sir Syed Institute of Learning & Motivation, Battagram

Dera Ismail Khan 
 Army Public School and College, D.I.Khan
 Broghil (Chilmarabad) High School
 Broghil (Garmchashma "Hot Spring") Primary School
 Broghil (Ghararm) Community Primary School
 Daulatpur Mond Primary School
 Garamchasma Primary School
 Gulshanabad Community Primary School
 Jabbarwala Boys' Primary School
 Jabbarwala Girls' Primary School
 Kachigari Afghan Refugee Primary School
 Kishmanjo Primary School
 Lashker Goz Primary School
 Lasht College, Yarkhun
 Matwala Shah Girls' Primary School
 Muaawia Girls' Middle School
 Musa Khar Government Boys' Middle School
 Paharpur (Shah Dao) Girls' Primary School, Muhammad Hussain
 Rukoot Primary School, Broghil
 The City School, D.I.Khan
 The Educators, D.I.Khan
 Dar-e-Arqam School, D.I.Khan
 The Mashriq Schools, D.I.Khan
 The Intellectuals School, D.I.Khan
 University WENSAM College, D.I.Khan
 Wisdom Science College Chokara Karak, Karak
 Pennell high school & College Bannu, Bannu
 International Islamic University Islamabad (IIUI Schools), Kohat Chungi
 Army Public High School, Bannu Cantt
 FG Public School
 Iqbal Public School, Kachari Road
 The City School, miranshah road
 Govt. High School no. 2, Kachari Gate
 Hira High School, Sokari Road
 Faran Public School, Chai Bazar

Dir Lower
 Pakhtukhwa School System

Haripur

 Sadat Model Public School, Baldher
 Learning Ville International School

Kohat
 Cadet College, Kohat
 Garrison Cadet College Kohat
 Iqra Public School And College, Kohat
 The Knowledge House, Kohat
 Al-Madina Education Academy & College, Razgir Banda Billitang, Kohat
 Intellectual School and College, Kohat

Mansehra
 Dubai International Public School And College Mansehra
 Sky International School & College 
 Jinnah Basic School and College Mansehra
 Government Commerce College & Management Sciences 
 Army Public School and College
 Dar-e-Arqam Schools 
 Fauji Foundation
 Mansehra International Public School and College
 Yasin Academy School & College, Mansehra
 The Peace Group of School and Colleges, Mansehra Campus 
 Khyber Public School & College 
 Iqra Academy 
 The Educators 
 Sir Syed Ahmed Saheed School & College 
 Garden Public School & College
 Fatima School & College For Girls (Bherkund)
 Government Higher Secondary School Peeran
 Government Post Graduate College, Mansehra
 The Smart School, Mansehra Campus

Mardan
 Pak Arab Educators School System Mardan
 The Mardan Lyceum (School System)
 The Jinnah International School 
 The Mardan Model School and college Mardan
 The Yaqeen Model School and College Bakhshali Mardan
 The Read Schools Mardan
 Al- Tayyaba Public School
Roots Millennium School Mardan Campus

Nowshera
 The City School, Nowshera Cantt
 Govt High School Nowshera Cantt, Nowshera Cantt
 Daffodils Schooling System, Nowshera Cantt
 The Khumaryan Public School, Nowshera City
 Al-Huda School & College Nowshera, Nowshera Cantt.
Millennium Education River Tree Campus, Nowshera

Peshawar
 Frontier Children's Academy
 Frontier Youth's Academy
 Peshawar Model School and College
 Forward Public School
 The City School, Peshawar Campus
 Pak-Turk Maarif International Schools & Colleges
 Peshawar Cambridge School System Khazana Peshawar
Presentation Convent School, Peshawar
St. Mary's High School, Peshawar
Army public school junior Peshawar
Army public school girls college Peshawar
Army public school and boys college Peshawar

Swat
 Catholic Public High School, Sangota
 Excelsior College Swat, Sangota
 The City School, College Colony, Saidu Sharif
 Danish Model School, Villa (Thana Campus)
 Eurasian School International Education system Kanju Swat

Punjab

Burewala 
Research School International (Burewala Campus)

Gujranwala
St Joseph's English High School
Kin's International Public High School

Lahore
Sacred Heart High School for Boys
Sacred Heart High School for Girls, Lahore
St Francis High School, Lahore
Govt. Boys High School, Head Balloki
Future World School
Al Quran Lab
Lahore Grammar School
Aitchison College
Froebels 
Army Public School
Roots Milleninum School
Beaconhouse School System
Divisional Public School

Multan
 Jinnah Highs School System, Multan
 La Salle High School Multan
 Nishat High School For Boys
 Lahore Grammar School
 Educator Gulgasht Colony Multan
 Maif schools in Punjab, Patan
 Zakariya Public school, northern bypass, Multan.

Murree
Presentation Convent High School, Murree

Muzaffargarh
 Govt. High School
 Comprehensive School
 Sardar Kauray Khan public higher secondary school
 City Science & Art Academy, Muzaffargarh

Jhang
 Al-Madina Public School

Jhelum
Presentation Convent School, Jhelum
St. Thomas' High School, Jhelum

Rawalpindi 

 Divisional Public School and College
 Askari Cement Model School Wah

Sargodha
The SEED Pre-School, Sargodha
St. Peter's High School Chak No. 79 NB Sargodha
Sargodha Catholic High School Chak No. 47 NB Sargodha
Presentation Convent Girls High School, University Road Sargodha
St. Theresa's Girls High School, Sargodha
St. Paul's Boys High School, Sargodha
Christian Girls High School, Sargodha

Sahiwal
Knewton School System, Sahiwal

Toba Tek Singh 
St. Peter's High School, Pakistan

Sindh

Reads school and college

Kashmore District
 Falcon Public School Kandh kot.

Ghotki
 Mari Petroleum Higher Secondary School, Daharki, Ghotki 
 The Educators (a project of Beaconhouse School System)
 Government Degree College Ghotki
 Roshan Tara Model Higher Secondary School Ghotki
 Islamia Public Higher Secondary School, Ghotki

Hyderabad

St Bonaventure's High School
 Pak-China International Schools & College System, Jamshoro
 Riba public Higher secondary school Jamshoro
The Educators Jamshoro
Labaik Public school Jamshoro
The pioneer school Jamshoro
Shaheed Ali Raza High School Jamshoro
Little step Jamshoro
Ridge view high school Jamshoro

Karachi

 The Vision School
 The SAMI School
 The Smart School
 St. Michael School
 The Educators
 Szabist
St Joseph's Convent School, Karachi
St. Patrick's High School, Karachi
St. Patrick's Technical School
St Paul's English High School
Convent of Jesus and Mary, Karachi
St Paul's High School
St. Lawrence’s Girls School, Karachi
St. Lawrence's Boys School
Karachi Public School
Karachi Grammar School
Happy Home School
Bahria College Karachi
Lahore Grammar School

Nawabshah

 AIR Foundation School System Nawabshah Campus
 Deeni bright future middle school jam sahib road.
 The City School, Senior Branch, Society 
 Mariam Convent High School
 Foundation Public School (FPS Nwbh)
 AIR Foundation School System
 Fauji Foundation Model School, Society
 Govt. Boys High School Bandhi
 TES Public Higher Secondary School, Daur
 Gulshan public high school housing society Nawabshah
 Noor Model Public School, Marium Road, Nawabshah

Khairpur
 Mikaza Royal Academy
 The City School
 PakTurk International Schools and Colleges
 Atia Higher Secondary School
 Sultan-ul-Madaris
 Muslim Public School Thari Mirwah
 The Innovative Education Foundation
Government Boys Primary School Mothparja

Jamshoro
PakTurk school lumhs branch

Larkana
 Cadet College, Larkana
 D Grammar School, Larkana
 The Educators (a project of Beaconhouse School System)
 Government Pilot Higher Secondary School, Larkana
 Model School Cadet College, Larkana
 Genius Foundation Public School, Warah
 SZABIST intermediate college, Sachal colony Larkana
 Galaxy Smart School System, Faisal Colony, Larkana

Sukkur

St. Mary's High School, Sukkur

Tharparkar
 Government Provincialized High School, Diplo

Balochistan

Dera bugti
 JawanSal bugti Public School Sui..
 Govt High Boys School Bugti Colony Sui.

Quetta
St Francis Grammar School
St. Joseph's Convent School, Quetta
Army Public Schools & Colleges System

See also
 Army Public Schools & Colleges System

References